The Rudston Baronetcy, of Hayton in the County of York, was a title in the Baronetage of England. It was created on 29 August 1642 for Walter Rudston, at whose manor house in Hayton. 
King Charles I had stayed for a few days on his way from York to Hull in April of that year.
The title became extinct with the death of the third Baronet in 1709.

Rudston baronets, of Hayton (1642)
Sir Walter Rudston, 1st Baronet (c. 1597 – 29 December 1650)
Sir Thomas Rudston, 2nd Baronet (8 August 1639 – 24 October 1707)
Sir Thomas Rudston, 3rd Baronet (7 April 1681 – 1 December 1709)

(Contributor note : dates supplied from Hayton Parish Register)

References

Extinct baronetcies in the Baronetage of England